Shah Qaryeh (also Romanized as Shāh Qaryeh; also known as Morādān) is a village in Khanmirza Rural District, Khanmirza District, Lordegan County, Chaharmahal and Bakhtiari Province, Iran. At the 2006 census, its population was 2,599, in 566 families. The village is populated by Lurs.

References 

Populated places in Lordegan County
Luri settlements in Chaharmahal and Bakhtiari Province